Rameez Aziz (born 15 September 1990) is a Pakistani first-class cricketer who plays for Habib Bank Limited. In April 2018, he was named in Sindh's squad for the 2018 Pakistan Cup. In March 2019, he was named in Punjab's squad for the 2019 Pakistan Cup. In September 2019, he was named in Sindh's squad for the 2019–20 Quaid-e-Azam Trophy tournament.

References

External links
 

1990 births
Living people
Pakistani cricketers
Baluchistan cricketers
Habib Bank Limited cricketers
Karachi cricketers
Karachi Dolphins cricketers
Cricketers from Karachi